is a Japanese professional football club based in Tosu, Saga Prefecture. The club plays in the J1 League, which is the top tier of football in the country.

Name origin
Sagan is a coined word with a couple of meanings behind it. This symbolises many small elements uniting to form one formidable object, for example as a metaphor for a team.

History
In February 1997, Sagan was established as a new club which virtually took over Tosu Futures, which became insolvent in the previous month, and were admitted to participate Japan Football League from 1997 to 1998, as well as J. League Cup in 1997 as a preferential measure, although J. League Associate Membership status was not awarded to Sagan. In 1999 they were admitted to the new J. League Division 2 (J2) as one of the "Original Ten", which were the ten first members of the J2. They remained at the league until their promotion to J1 at the end of the 2011 season. Little by little, Sagan Tosu started to establish itself as one of the top clubs in the country with the new President & Chief Operating Officer Minoru Takehara, who is also part owner of the club.

In their first season at the J. League Division 1 in 2012, confounding the prediction of many critics about their immediate relegation to J2, they have been maintaining their position between 5th and 11th places all the way through the season, except on Matchweek 2, in which they were ranked 13th. They were ranked third after the 33rd week, having a chance to qualify for the 2013 AFC Champions League if they hadn't lost to Yokohama F. Marinos in the last match of the season. However, they have lost to Yokohama by 0–1, wrapping up the season in 5th place, while Urawa Red Diamonds defeated Nagoya Grampus and were ranked 3rd. They also became the first club in Asia to sign a partnership with Warrior Sports, who sponsor many overseas clubs, including English side Liverpool FC.

In 2013, they made it to the semifinal of the Emperor's Cup for the first time in the club's history, becoming the first club based in Kyushu to make it to the semifinal of the Emperor's Cup since Nippon Steel Yawata SC had done in the 1981 edition. In 2013, they invited A-League team Sydney FC along with the former Italian international player Alessandro Del Piero, for a Japan Tour for the first time.

In 2014, the club had been in their most successful season in J. League Division 1, being ranked on the top of 2014 J. League Division 1 on the 1st, 2nd, 13th, and 18th matchweek. However, the club made an announcement on 8 August which announced the termination of contract with the head coach Yoon Jung-Hwan all of a sudden, despite the apparently good season. During the course of the year, they continued on its international expansion and started a partnership with Italian side Juventus FC, for its Juventus Under-16 Japan Tour 2014.  On July 10, 2018, the club reached an agreement with former World Cup, UCL and Europa League winner, Fernando Torres. The aging star would play 35 games for the side, netting 5 goals before finally hanging up his boots on his star-studded career.

League & cup record

Key

Current squad

Out on loan

Retired number
17  Sakata Michitaka – A former professor of Saga University and the person which backed up in both the establishment of Tosu Futures and the team's revival as Sagan Tosu. He died due to kidney cancer on January 7, 2000. The number 17 indicates his day of death.

Club staff
For the 2023 season.

Managerial history

Kit evolution

References

External links

  Official Site

 
Sports teams in Saga Prefecture
J.League clubs
Football clubs in Japan
Association football clubs established in 1997
1997 establishments in Japan
Japan Football League (1992–1998) clubs